This is a list of Canadian films slated for release in 2022:par

See also
 2022 in Canada
 2022 in Canadian television

References

External links
Feature Films Released In 2022 With Country of Origin Canada at IMDb

2022

Canada